The Village of Arts and Humanities is an arts organization in North Philadelphia. The Village was founded by Lily Yeh, an artist and Chinese immigrant who was a tenured professor at the Philadelphia School of Fine Arts. It has renovated dozens of urban lots and empty buildings with murals, mosaics, and gardens. In 2001 it received the Rudy Bruner Award for Urban Excellence. 
 
The Village was the subject of a Public Broadcasting Service documentary entitled An Angel in the Village.

See also

References

External links

 When Art Becomes Critical Practice: The Village of Arts and Humanities, Politics and Culture, November 9, 2009
 Bruner Foundation Gold Medal, 2001
 Village of Arts and Humanities uses digital production to highlight youth issues, Technically Philly, February 16, 2010

Arts organizations based in Pennsylvania
Organizations based in Philadelphia
Organizations established in 1989
North Philadelphia